Lauren Alice Quigley (born 28 February 1995) is an English competitive swimmer who has represented Great Britain at the FINA world championships and England in the Commonwealth Games.  She competed primarily in backstroke and freestyle events.  At the 2014 Commonwealth Games in Glasgow, she won three silver medals: 50-metre backstroke, 4x100-metre freestyle relay, and 4x100-metre medley relay.

References

External links

1995 births
Living people
Commonwealth Games silver medallists for England
English female swimmers
Swimmers at the 2014 Commonwealth Games
Commonwealth Games medallists in swimming
20th-century English women
21st-century English women
Medallists at the 2014 Commonwealth Games